Semi-syllable may refer to:
minor syllable, in phonology
a glyph of a semi-syllabary, in orthography

See also
Syllable (disambiguation)
Syllabic (disambiguation)